Ramsgate Sands, also known as Life at the Seaside, is an oil-on-canvas painting by William Powell Frith, made from 1851 to 1854, which depicts a beach scene in Ramsgate. The painting was Frith's first great commercial success: it was exhibited at the Royal Academy summer exhibition in 1854, and bought by Queen Victoria. Frith made a series of similar pictures, showing groups of people in contemporary scenes, including The Derby Day of 1858, The Railway Station of 1862, and Private View at the Royal Academy of 1883.

Background

After the South Eastern Railway reached Ramsgate Town railway station in 1846, the town of Ramsgate rapidly became a popular destination for day trips from London.
Frith was already a successful artist.  He became a member of the Royal Academy in 1853, and the painting was based on studies made by Frith during a holiday in Ramsgate in September 1851, where he was inspired by the variety of everyday life.  Dunedin Public Art Gallery holds an oil sketch from 1851-2.

Description
Frith takes advantage of the location to paint people of different social classes in contemporary modern dress.  The seaside was a place where the different classes, ages, and sexes could mix without the usual barriers.  Frith populates the painting with a variety of https://www.rct.uk/collection/search#/1/collection/405068/ramsgate-sands-life-at-the-seasidestock characters - a grandmother with a parasol, a gentleman seated reading a newspaper, an over-dressed "swell", a variety of entertainers and vendors.  Frith also included a self-portrait: he is looking over the shoulder of the man on the far right, with two ladies and a girl in white in front.  The small girl paddling in the sea near the centre of the painting, staring directly out of the picture, is thought to be his daughter.  All are viewed from the sea, looking towards the beach, separating the viewer from the scene.  Many of the buildings in the background - the clock tower, the granite obelisk erected in 1822, building with battlements on Harbour Parade, and the gable end of the building at the junction of Albion Place and Madeira Walk above the cliffs - remain recognisable today.
 
Unusually, to modern eyes, the characters are wearing their usual clothes on the beach, including crinolines for the women and waistcoats for the men, alongside more recognisable seaside images of sandcastles, donkey rides, and a Punch and Judy show.  Two telescopes hint at people-watching or voyeurism (the morality of women https://www.rct.uk/collection/search#/1/collection/405068/ramsgate-sands-life-at-the-seasideobserving men bathing was a contemporary issue, particularly as men often bathed naked).  Bathing machines are visible in the background, but the painting shows no bathers, only genteel paddling at the edge of the sea.

The painting measures . The back of the painting bears the inscription "Life at the Sea side".

Reception
The painting received a mixed reception.  It was dismissed by one contemporary commentator as "vulgar Cockney business" or a "tissue of vulgarity" and it was rejected by several potential buyers before it was exhibited at the Royal Academy summer exhibition in 1854.

However, it became very popular with the viewing public at the exhibition, and it was praised by critics for its realistic depiction of modern life.  It was voted the "picture of the year" by the journal Royal Academy Pictures and was purchased by the printers Lloyd Brothers for 1,000 guineas.  When Queen Victoria expressed an interest in buying the painting - she had visited Ramsgate several times in the 1820s and 1830s, staying at Townley House and Albion House - it was sold for the same price to her, and displayed at Osborne House.

Lloyd Brothers retained the right to reproduce the painting as an engraving for sale to the public as prints, and Frith may have earned as much as £3,000 from the sales.

Notes

References
 
 William Powell Frith - Ramsgate Sands, 2 June 2010
 A thousand words, The Guardian, 11 June 2011
 Water, Leisure and Culture: European Historical Perspectives, Susan C. Anderson, Bruce Tabb, p. 89-92

1854 paintings
Paintings by William Powell Frith
Paintings in the Royal Collection of the United Kingdom
Maritime paintings